The 1978 Men's World Weightlifting Championships were held in Gettysburg, Pennsylvania, United States from October 4 to October 8, 1978. There were 185 men in action from 35 nations.

Medal summary

Medal table
Ranking by Big (Total result) medals 

Ranking by all medals: Big (Total result) and Small (Snatch and Clean & Jerk)

References
Results (Sport 123)
Weightlifting World Championships Seniors Statistics

External links
International Weightlifting Federation

World Weightlifting Championships
World Weightlifting Championships
International weightlifting competitions hosted by the United States
1978 in weightlifting